Same-sex marriage in Iowa has been legally recognized since a decision of the Iowa Supreme Court on April 3, 2009. Marriage licenses became available to same-sex couples on April 27. In 2005, six same-sex couples who were denied marriage licenses in Iowa filed a lawsuit in Polk County. In 2007, the Polk County District Court ruled in favor of the couples in Varnum v. Brien. On April 3, 2009, the Iowa Supreme Court unanimously upheld the lower court's ruling, making Iowa the third U.S. state to legalize same-sex marriage, after Massachusetts and Connecticut.

Polling indicates that an overwhelming majority of Iowaians support same-sex marriage.

Background
In 1998, following court decisions on same-sex unions in other states that suggested that denying the right to marry to same-sex couples was incompatible with the equal protection clause of a state constitution like Iowa's, Iowa legislators who hoped to avoid a similar court challenge tried without success to pass a statute to prohibit same-sex marriages.

Varnum v. Brien

Six same-sex couples in Polk County represented by Lambda Legal sought the right to marry their same-sex partners in Iowa. They brought suit in 2005 arguing that denying them marriage licenses violated the liberty and equal protection clauses of the State Constitution. Judge Robert Hanson of Polk County District Court ruled in favor of the plaintiffs on August 30, 2007. The next morning, Hanson stayed his decision pending an appeal to the Iowa Supreme Court. Within two hours after the district court published its ruling, two men from Des Moines submitted an application for marriage to the county recorder and their application was accepted. The next morning, several other couples applied for marriage licenses before Hanson issued his stay. Iowa marriage law requires a three-day waiting period between the initial application for a marriage license and the time the marriage becomes official, unless this waiting period is waived by a judge. Sean Fritz and Tim McQuillan, residents of Ames and students at Iowa State University, were the only couple to receive such a waiver before Hanson issued his stay. After receiving the waiver and applying for a marriage license on the morning of August 31, the couple was married in a short ceremony that morning by a Unitarian Universalist minister on the minister's front lawn in Des Moines.
   
Two other Ames residents who applied for a marriage license before the stay, Terry Lowman and Mark Kassis, were married on September 2 in a ceremony at the Unitarian Universalist Fellowship of Ames. Lowman and Kassis' three-day waiting period was waived by a judge; however, Hanson's stay occurred before the couple was able to record the marriage license. However, it is legal opinion that the marriage is legal in Iowa.

Upon appeal, a unanimous Iowa Supreme Court affirmed Hanson's ruling in Varnum v. Brien on April 3, 2009. Using the standard known as intermediate scrutiny to evaluate the state's justifications for denying marriage licenses to same-sex couples, the court determined that denying a marriage licenses on the basis of sexual orientation violated the equal protection clause of the Iowa Constitution. Licenses were originally to be available 21 days after the ruling on April 24, but the availability of licenses was postponed until April 27 due to a Furlough day.

Despite the ruling in Varnum, the Iowa Department of Public Health had refused to recognize same-sex marriages when completing birth and death certificates. On December 12, 2012, ruling in Buntemeyer v. Iowa DPH, a state court ordered the department to list the names of two women, a married lesbian couple, on the death certificate of their stillborn son. The Iowa Supreme Court heard arguments that same day in the department's appeal of a decision in Gartner v. Newton that ordered it to enter the names of two women as parents on a birth certificate. On May 3, 2013, the court unanimously affirmed the lower court's ruling in Gartner and said that "By naming the nonbirthing spouse on the birth certificate of a married lesbian couple's child, the child is ensured support from that parent and the parent establishes fundamental legal rights at the moment of birth".

Judicial retention elections
On November 2, 2010, Iowa Supreme Court justices David L. Baker, Michael Streit and Marsha Ternus, who participated in the unanimous 2009 ruling that Iowa could not deny marriage licenses based on sexual orientation, were removed from office after judicial retention elections. Their removal followed campaigning by groups opposed to same-sex marriage including the National Organization for Marriage. The three judges did no campaigning on their own behalf, but were supported by numerous third parties.

On November 6, 2012, Justice David Wiggins won retention in an election, largely due to the fact that Iowa had reversed its opposition to same-sex marriage, now showing majority support.

Legislative proposals
State constitutional amendment to ban same-sex marriage were proposed several times in the Iowa General Assembly in the wake of the judicial rulings. To amend the Constitution of Iowa, two consecutive sessions of the Assembly would need to approve the amendment, after which it would be placed on the ballot for final approval by the Iowa electorate.

An amendment was first proposed in 2008 but did not pass. The Assembly did not vote on a constitutional amendment in 2009, and Senate Majority Leader Michael Gronstal said he would not allow one to be brought to the floor in 2010. In a joint press release with House Speaker Pat Murphy on April 3, 2009, Gronstal welcomed the court's decision, saying "When all is said and done, we believe the only lasting question about today's events will be why it took us so long. It is a tough question to answer because treating everyone fairly is really a matter of Iowa common sense and Iowa common decency. Iowa has always been a leader in the area of civil rights." Democratic leaders of the Iowa Senate and the Iowa House of Representatives during the 2009-2010 legislative session opposed a vote on an amendment. In the next session, debate on a proposed constitutional amendment to ban same-sex marriage in Iowa attracted national news coverage after Zach Wahls, a college student and son of a lesbian couple, addressed the Iowa House Judiciary Committee in a public hearing on January 31, 2011. A video of his testimony posted on YouTube went viral. On February 1, 2011, with Republicans in a majority in the Iowa House, the House passed House Joint Resolution 6 by a vote of 62–37. Democratic leaders promised to block debate in the Senate, which they did.

Same-sex marriage could also have been banned by constitutional convention, which Iowa voters can initiate once a decade. On November 2, 2010, voters defeated a proposed constitutional convention by a 2–1 margin.

In June 2015, former Iowa Supreme Court justices Michael Streit and David L. Baker, who participated in the unanimous Varnum ruling, expressed support for Obergefell v. Hodges. Baker said, "I think it just shows that we were a little bit ahead of our time in anticipating this result", and Streit said, "I think all seven of us are very proud of what we did. Has marriage been lessened because of what we did? No, and in the U.S. all people will be able to enjoy the freedoms of America and be treated as equal citizens under our law". Streit and Baker were removed from their position as justices by Iowa voters in 2010, following a campaign by opponents of same-sex marriage. Reacting to the Obergefell ruling, Kate Varnum, plaintiff in Varnum, said, "To think how far we've come in the past 10 years since we filed the lawsuit in Iowa - it's incredible". Governor Terry Branstad said he was disappointed with Obergefell and called for a constitutional amendment to ban same-sex marriage, but acknowledged that such an amendment has virtually no chance of passing.

In 2023, a group of Republican lawmakers introduced two bills to add a same-sex marriage ban to the Iowa Constitution and declare the Respect for Marriage Act, signed into law by President Joe Biden in December 2022, inoperable in Iowa. The bills, which political experts and advocates widely considered unconstitutional, were not moved out of committee and died in March 2023.

Economic impact
A 2008 study from the University of California, Los Angeles analyzed the impact of allowing same-sex couples to marry on Iowa's state budget. The study concluded that allowing same-sex couples to marry would result in a net gain of approximately $5.3 million each year for the state. This net impact would be the result of savings in expenditures on state means-tested public benefit programs and an increase in state income and sales tax revenue.

Marriage statistics
Between April 2009 and March 2010, 2,020 same-sex couples were married in Iowa, accounting for 10.1% of all marriages conducted in the state during that period. Only 815 couples were from Iowa, with the rest being from out of state, predominantly from neighboring Illinois, Missouri and Nebraska.

By June 26, 2015, the day the U.S. Supreme Court legalized same-sex marriage nationwide in Obergefell v. Hodges, approximately 11,000 same-sex couples had married in Iowa, mostly in Polk, Scott, Johnson, Pottawattamie and Linn counties.

Public opinion
{| class="wikitable"
|+style="font-size:100%" | Public opinion for same-sex marriage in Iowa
|-
! style="width:190px;"| Poll source
! style="width:200px;"| Date(s)administered
! class=small | Samplesize
! Margin oferror
! style="width:100px;"| % support
! style="width:100px;"| % opposition
! style="width:40px;"| % no opinion
|-
| Public Religion Research Institute
| align=center| March 8–November 9, 2021
| align=center| ?
| align=center| ?
|  align=center| 72%
| align=center| 23%
| align=center| 5%
|-
| Public Religion Research Institute
| align=center| January 7–December 20, 2020
| align=center| 528 random telephoneinterviewees
| align=center| ?
|  align=center| 62%
| align=center| 30%
| align=center| 8%
|-
| Public Religion Research Institute
| align=center| April 5–December 23, 2017
| align=center| 895 random telephoneinterviewees
| align=center| ?
|  align=center| 59%
| align=center| 33%
| align=center| 8%
|-
| Public Religion Research Institute
| align=center| May 18, 2016–January 10, 2017
| align=center| 1,325 random telephoneinterviewees
| align=center| ?
|  align=center| 59%
| align=center| 31%
| align=center| 11%
|-
| Public Religion Research Institute
| align=center| April 29, 2015–January 7, 2016
| align=center| 1,103 random telephoneinterviewees
| align=center| ?
|  align=center| 56%
| align=center| 35%
| align=center| 9%
|-
| New York Times/CBS News/YouGov
| align=center| September 20–October 1, 2014
| align=center| 2,359 likely voters
| align=center| ± 2.2%
|  align=center| 53%
| align=center| 33%
| align=center| 14%
|-
| Public Religion Research Institute
| align=center| April 2, 2014–January 4, 2015
| align=center| 681 random telephoneinterviewees
| align=center| ?
|  align=center| 57%
| align=center| 37%
| align=center| 7%
|-
| Public Policy Polling
| align=center| February 20–23, 2014
| align=center| 869 voters
| align=center| ± 3.3%
|  align=center| 47%
| align=center| 44%
| align=center| 9%
|-
| Public Policy Polling
| align=center| July 5–7, 2013
| align=center| 668 registered voters
| align=center| ± 3.8%
|  align=center| 46%
| align=center| 45%
| align=center| 9%
|-
| Public Policy Polling
| align=center| February 1–3, 2013
| align=center| 846 voters
| align=center| ?
|  align=center| 46%
| align=center| 43%
| align=center| 11%
|-
| Public Policy Polling
| align=center| August 19–21, 2011
| align=center| 798 voters
| align=center| ± 3.5%
|  align=center| 46%
| align=center| 45%
| align=center| 9%
|-

See also
 Jene Newsome
 LGBT rights in Iowa
 Same-sex marriage in the United States
 Same-sex marriage legislation in the United States
 Same-sex marriage status in the United States by state

References

External links
 
 One year later, gay marriage repeal appears to be on backburner. The Iowa Independent. April 1, 2010.

Iowa law
Iowa
LGBT rights in Iowa
2009 in LGBT history
2009 in Iowa